Acleris stibiana is a species of moth of the family Tortricidae. It is found in China, Russia (Siberia) and Japan.

The wingspan is about 16 mm.

The larvae feed on Viburnum burejanum.

References

Moths described in 1883
stibiana
Moths of Asia